George (died 739) was the duke of Naples for a decade beginning in 729. 

George succeeded Theodore I and continued his prudent policy of balancing between the Byzantine Empire and the papacy, at that time embroiled in a conflict over the iconoclastic controversy. He was succeeded by Gregory I.

An ancient monument, dedicated to George, can be found to this day at Terracina.

Sources
Gay, Jules. L'Italie méridionale et l'empire Byzantin: Livre I. Burt Franklin: New York, 1904.

739 deaths
8th-century dukes of Naples
Year of birth unknown